Cho Won-woo (also known as Cho Won-wu, born 29 October 1994) is a South Korean sport sailor. He competed in the 2020 Summer Olympics.

References

External links
 
 

1994 births
Living people
Sportspeople from Busan
Sailors at the 2020 Summer Olympics – RS:X
South Korean male sailors (sport)
Olympic sailors of South Korea
South Korean windsurfers